Hapoel Ashkelon F.C. (Moadon Kaduregel Hapoel Ashkelon) is an Israeli football club based in Ashkelon. The club currently competes in Liga Bet and plays at the 5,250-capacity Sala Stadium.

History
After being founded in 1955, Hapoel Ashkelon spent their first few decades in the lower leagues of Israeli football. 1995–96 they won Liga Alef South division and promoted to Liga Artzit (then the second tier) and in 1996–97, they achieved second successive promotion, to Liga Leumit (then the top tier) as Liga Artzit champions. However, the club finished bottom of the division, with a points deduction. In 1999–2000, they were relegated to the third tier (which became Liga Artzit following the formation of the Israeli Premier League as the top tier in 1999), before returning to the second tier (now Liga Leumit), after winning Liga Artzit in the 2004–05 season. The club reached the State Cup final for the first time in 2007, but despite taking the lead, lost 5–4 on penalties to Hapoel Tel Aviv after a 1–1 draw. At the end of the season, the club finished 11th and relegated to Liga Artzit.

In 2008–09, the club finished as runners-up in Liga Artzit and promoted back to Liga Leumit.

In 2009–10, the club finished as runners-up in Liga Leumit and promoted back to the Israeli Premier League. Just a season later, the club finished 15th, and relegated back to Liga Leumit.

In 2013–14, the club finished 15th in Liga Leumit, and relegated to Liga Alef. The club made an immediate return to Liga Leumit, after winning Liga Alef South division in the following season. In 2015–16, the club won the Leumit Toto Cup following a victory of 1–0 against F.C. Ashdod. At the end of the season, they finished as runners-up and made a return to the Israeli Premier League, their second successive promotion under the guidance of Yuval Naim.

Little Argentina
Over the years, Hapoel Ashkelon has developed a tradition of signing Argentine footballers, both Jewish and non-Jewish. Many times, there were two Argentine players who played together and developed an attacking partnership together. Among those who have represented Argentina within the squad have been Bryan Man, Carlos Chacana, Naón Isidro, Jonny Tennenbaum, Fernando Fligman and Gastón Sangoy.

Current squad
 As to 12 February 2022

Notable former players

Notable former managers

 Rafi Cohen (born 1965)

References

External links
Fansite 
Hapoel Ashkelon The Israel Football Association 

 
Ashkelon
Ashkelon
Association football clubs established in 1955
1955 establishments in Israel
Sport in Ashkelon